Atyoida bisulcata, also called  or  in Hawaiian, is a species of freshwater shrimp endemic to Hawaii in the family Atyidae. It was described in 1840 by John Witt Randall and is the type species for the genus Atyoida.

Description 
This species of freshwater shrimp grow to about 2 inches in length. They don't possess any type of claws but have a unique set of pincers, containing bristle-like hairs that are  primarily used to catch and filter small food particles from water columns. The shrimp are often characterized by either a golden-brown or dark-green/black pigmentation.

Distribution & habitat 
‘Ōpae kala‘ole can be commonly found on the islands of Kaua‘i, O‘ahu, Moloka‘i, Maui, and Hawai‘i, where they occupy streams of high water quality. They often inhabit the higher parts of streams, where the water is typically flowing the quickest. Oftentimes, they can be seen upstream of 100 ft waterfalls.

Human use & cultural significance 
As of today, the consumption of the shrimp continues and is still considered a prized source of food. They were regarded as a favorite delicacy consumed by the early Native Hawaiians. However, the sale of the shrimp is illegal while its consumption is not.

References

Taxa named by John Witt Randall
Endemic fauna of Hawaii
Atyidae
Crustaceans described in 1840
Edible crustaceans